Octávio dos Santos Barrosa (21 December 1920 – 21 February 2001) was a Portuguese footballer who played as defender.

External links 
 

1920 births
2001 deaths
Association football defenders
Portugal international footballers
Portuguese footballers
Primeira Liga players
Sporting CP footballers
Footballers from Lisbon